Eugenio Padlan Pérez (November 13, 1896 – August 4, 1957) was a Filipino politician who served as Speaker of the House of Representatives of the Philippines from 1946 to 1953. He was a member of the Liberal Party, whose president he served as during his term as Speaker.

Early life

Pérez was born in San Carlos, Pangasinan. He earned his Bachelor of Arts at the University of the Philippines and his law degree from that institution's College of Law. While in law school, he worked as a clerk in the Bureau of Agriculture and the Executive Bureau.

Political career

Pérez first entered politics in 1926 when he was elected to the municipal council of his hometown, San Carlos. In 1928, he was elected to the Philippine Legislature as a Representative of the 2nd district of Pangasinan. He served for eight consecutive terms.

In 1946, Pérez joined the newly established Liberal Party, which obtained a congressional majority in the House of Representatives in the 1946 general elections. He was elected Speaker of the House of Representatives when the 1st Congress of the Philippines convened later that year, and would serve as House Speaker throughout the 1st and 2nd Congresses.

Pérez was a leading congressional ally of Presidents Manuel Roxas and Elpidio Quirino, both of whom were Liberals. He helped secure the passage of the Bell Trade Act and the Parity Rights Amendment to the Constitution, allowing American citizens and corporations equal access to Philippine minerals, forests and other natural resources. He defended the exercise of President Quirino of emergency powers granted to the President after the end of World War II. When Quirino grew increasingly unpopular, Pérez rejected pleas from fellow Members of Congress to challenge the incumbent president for the Liberal Party nomination in the 1953 presidential elections. Perez managed the unsuccessful re-election campaign of Quirino in 1953.

The Liberal Party lost its congressional majority in the House of Representatives in the 1953 general elections. Pérez assumed the role of Minority Floor Leader, while he was succeeded as House Speaker by José Laurel, Jr. of the Nacionalista Party. Pérez died in office in August 1957.

Family

Pérez was married to a soprano, Consuelo Salazar with whom he had three legitimate children, Victoria, Consuelo and Eugenio Jr.

His first daughter, Victoria, was the first wife of Jose de Venecia, who would become House Speaker thirty-five years after Pérez's death. His second daughter Consuelo is a lawyer and served as associate commissioner of the National Telecommunications Commission and commissioner of the CICT . His legitimate son Eugenio Perez Jr. is  a Dartmouth alumnus.

During his bachelorhood, he had an acknowledged natural child, José "Pepito"Pérez born December 3, 1929.  During World War II while Japanese troops continued their ruthless occupation of Philippine territories, José hid in the jungle to avoid capture and abuse.  In the weeks leading up to the Bataan Death March (1942); José led his aunt and a childhood friend into the jungle to live until it was safe to return home. José in his own words "when I was twelve, I had to hide my aunt from the Japanese or else they would rape her, me and my friend took rifles from dead Japanese soldiers then took her to the jungle to hide until it was safe to come out again".  Inspired by his World War II experiences, José joined the United States Navy in 1946 at the age of seventeen.

Notes

References
 

|-

Speakers of the House of Representatives of the Philippines
Members of the House of Representatives of the Philippines from Pangasinan
20th-century Filipino lawyers
People from San Carlos, Pangasinan
University of the Philippines alumni
1896 births
1957 deaths
Nacionalista Party politicians
Majority leaders of the House of Representatives of the Philippines
Minority leaders of the House of Representatives of the Philippines
Presidents of the Liberal Party of the Philippines
Members of the Philippine Legislature
Members of the National Assembly of the Philippines